Arif Ahmed may refer to:

 Arif Ahmed (cricketer), Bangladeshi cricketer
 Arif Ahmed (philosopher), English philosopher